Cho Sung-hwan may also refer to:

Cho Sung-hwan (cyclist) (born 1943), South Korean cyclist
Jo Sung-hwan (born 1970), South Korean football player and manager
Cho Sung-hwan (baseball) (born 1976), South Korean baseball player
Cho Sung-hwan (footballer, born 1982), South Korean football player
Cho Sung-hwan (footballer, born 1985), South Korean football player